The 2019–20 Big Ten men's basketball season began with practices in October 2019, followed by the start of the 2019–20 NCAA Division I men's basketball season on November 5, 2019. The regular season ended on March 8, 2020.

With a win against Indiana on March 7, 2020, Wisconsin earned a share of the Big Ten regular season championship. With a win over Michigan on March 8, Maryland earned a share of their first Big Ten regular season championship. Also with a win on March 8 against Ohio State, Michigan State earned a share of their third straight Big Ten regular season championship. Due to tie-breaking rules, Wisconsin received the No. 1 seed, Michigan State the No. 2 seed, and Maryland the No. 3 seed in the Big Ten tournament.

The Big Ten tournament was scheduled to be played at Bankers Life Fieldhouse in Indianapolis, Indiana from March 11 through 15, until the tournament was canceled due to the COVID-19 pandemic. The NCAA Tournament was likewise canceled on March 12.

Iowa big man Luka Garza was named Big Ten Player of the Year. Wisconsin coach Greg Gard was named Coach of the Year.

Head coaches

Coaching changes prior to the season

Nebraska 
On March 26, 2019, Nebraska fired head coach Tim Miles. Four days later, the school hired former Chicago Bulls' head coach Fred Hoiberg as the next head coach.

Michigan 
On May 13, 2019, Michigan head coach John Beilein left the school to accept the head coaching position with the Cleveland Cavaliers. Nine days later, the school hired former Michigan player and member of the "Fab Five" Juwan Howard as head coach.

Coaches

Notes: 
 All records, appearances, titles, etc. are from time with current school only. 
 Year at school includes 2019–20 season.
 Overall and Big Ten records are from time at current school and are through the beginning of the season. 
 Turgeon's ACC conference record excluded since Maryland began Big Ten Conference play in 2014–15.

Preseason

Preseason conference poll 
Prior to the conference's annual media day, unofficial awards and a poll were chosen by a panel of 28 writers, two for each team in the conference. Michigan State was the near unanimous selection to win the conference, receiving 27 of 28 first-place votes.

Preseason All-Big Ten 
On October 2, 2019, a panel of conference media selected a 10-member preseason All-Big Ten Team and Player of the Year.

Preseason watchlists
Below is a table of notable preseason watch lists.

Preseason national polls

Regular season

Rankings

On December 2, 2019, Michigan tied the 1989–90 Kansas Jayhawks for the largest jump in the history of the AP Poll as they jumped from unranked to No. 4.

Early season tournaments 
Nine of the 14 Big Ten teams participated in early season tournaments. All Big Ten teams participated in the ACC–Big Ten Challenge against Atlantic Coast Conference teams, the 21st year for the event. Eight of the 14 teams participated in the Gavitt Tipoff Games, including Michigan State who participated for the first time.

Player of the week
Throughout the conference regular season, the Big Ten offices named one or two players of the week and one or two freshmen of the week each Monday.

Cassius Winston was named the Naismith National Player of the Week on January 6, 2020.

Conference matrix
This table summarizes the head-to-head results between teams in conference play. Each team will play 20 conference games, and at least one game against each opponent.

Honors and awards

All-Big Ten awards and teams
On March 9, 2020, the Big Ten announced most of its conference awards.

USBWA 
On March 10, the U.S. Basketball Writers Association released its Men's All-District Teams, based upon voting from its national membership. There were nine regions from coast to coast, and a player and coach of the year were selected in each. The following lists all the Big Ten representatives selected within their respective regions.

District II (NY, NJ, DE, DC, PA, WV)
Lamar Stevens, Penn State

District III (VA, NC, SC, MD)
Anthony Cowan, Maryland
Jalen Smith, Maryland

District V (OH, IN, IL, MI, MN, WI)
Ayo Dosunmu, Illinois
Daniel Oturu, Minnesota
Zavier Simpson, Michigan
Xavier Tillman, Michigan State
Kaleb Wesson, Ohio State
Cassius Winston, Michigan State

Player of the Year
Luka Garza, Iowa
All-District Team
Luka Garza, Iowa,
Joe Wieskamp, Iowa

NABC
The National Association of Basketball Coaches announced their Division I All-District teams on March 22, recognizing the nation's best men's collegiate basketball student-athletes. Selected and voted on by member coaches of the NABC, the selections on this list were then eligible for NABC Coaches' All-America Honors. The following list represented the District 7 players chosen to the list.

First Team
Cassius Winston, Michigan State
Lamar Stevens, Penn State
Luka Garza, Iowa
Anthony Cowan Jr., Maryland
Daniel Oturu, Minnesota

Second Team
Jalen Smith, Maryland
Ayo Dosunmu, Illinois
Joe Wieskamp, Iowa
Kaleb Wesson, Ohio State
Zavier Simpson, Michigan

Postseason

Big Ten tournament

After the first two games of the tournament were played on March 11, the conference canceled the remainder of the tournament due to the ongoing COVID-19 pandemic.

References